Up North is a travel book by Charles Jennings, detailing his excursion from the south to Northern England. Throughout the duration of the book, written in 1992, he conveys a sense of grimness and hopelessness "up north" with a certain acerbic wit; he suggests, for instance, that the name Grimsby may be dissected as combining 'grim' and 'by the sea'.

The Mayor of Grimsby at the time commented that Jennings "should have stayed under his duvet down south."

References

British travel books
1992 non-fiction books
Books about England
Northern England